Phillip Russell (1932–2021) was an American arbovirologist, former commander of United States Army Medical Research and Development Command, and former president American Society of Tropical Medicine and Hygiene.

References  

1932 births
2021 deaths
American microbiologists
United States Army generals